Caryanda is large genus of grasshoppers in the subfamily Caryandinae (it was placed previously in the tribe Oxyini).  Species are recorded from Africa and Asia (India, China, Indo-China, through to New Guinea).

Species 
The Orthoptera Species File lists:
species group amplexicerca Ou, Liu & Zheng, 2007
 Caryanda amplexicerca Ou, Liu & Zheng, 2007
 Caryanda cyanonota Mao & Li, 2015
 Caryanda shuangjinga Mao & Li, 2015
species group aurata Mao, Ren & Ou, 2007
 Caryanda aurata Mao, Ren & Ou, 2007
 Caryanda colourfula Mao, Ren & Ou, 2011
 Caryanda nigrotibia Mao, Xu & Li, 2017
 Caryanda zhenyuanensis Mao, Xu & Li, 2017
species group dentata Mao & Ou, 2006
 Caryanda cyclata Zheng, 2008
 Caryanda dentata Mao & Ou, 2006
 Caryanda jiangchenga Mao, Niu & Zheng, 2015
species group nigrospina Mao, Ren & Ou, 2011
 Caryanda caesinota Mao & Li, 2016
 Caryanda heterochromia Mao & Huang, 2016
 Caryanda nigrospina Mao, Ren & Ou, 2011
species group viridis (Zheng & Mao, 1996)
 Caryanda albomaculata Mao, Ren & Ou, 2007
 Caryanda dehongensis Mao, Xu & Yang, 2003
 Caryanda eshana Mao, 2015
 Caryanda viridis (Zheng & Mao, 1996)
 Caryanda viridoides Mao, Ren & Ou, 2011
species group not assigned

 Caryanda albufurcula Zheng, 1988
 Caryanda amplipenna Lian & Zheng, 1989
 Caryanda atrogeniculata Zheng, Lin, Deng & Shi, 2015
 Caryanda azurea Gorochov & Storozhenko, 1994
 Caryanda badongensis Wang, 1995
 Caryanda bambusa Liu & Yin, 1987
 Caryanda beybienkoi Storozhenko, 2005
 Caryanda brachyceraea Li, 2006
 Caryanda byrrhofemura Zheng & Zhong, 2005
 Caryanda cachara (Kirby, 1914)
 Caryanda cultricerca Ou, Liu & Zheng, 2007
 Caryanda curvimargina Zheng & Ma, 1999
 Caryanda cylindrica (Ramme, 1929)
 Caryanda damingshana Zheng & Li, 2001
 Caryanda flavomaculata Bolívar, 1918
 Caryanda fujianensis Zheng, 1996
 Caryanda glauca Li, Ji & Lin, 1985
 Caryanda gracilis Liu & Yin, 1987
 Caryanda guangxiensis Li, Lu, Jiang & Meng, 1995
 Caryanda gulinensis Zheng, Shi & Chen, 1994
 Caryanda gyirongensis Huang, 1981
 Caryanda haii (Tinkham, 1940)
 Caryanda hubeiensis Wang, 1995
 Caryanda hunana Liu & Yin, 1987
 Caryanda jinpingensis Mao, Ren & Ou, 2011
 Caryanda jinzhongshanensis Jiang & Zheng, 1995
 Caryanda jiulianshana Fu & Zheng, 2003
 Caryanda jiuyishana Fu & Zheng, 2000
 Caryanda lancangensis Zheng, 1982
 Caryanda longhushanensis Li, Lu & You, 1996
 Caryanda macrocercusa (Mao & Ren, 2007)
 Caryanda maguanensis Mao, Ren & Ou, 2011
 Caryanda methiola Chang, 1939
 Caryanda miaoershana Fu, Zheng & Huang, 2002
 Caryanda microdentata Fu, Huang & Zheng, 2006
 Caryanda modesta (Giglio-Tos, 1907)
 Caryanda neoelegans Otte, 1995
 Caryanda nigrolineata Liang, 1987
 Caryanda nigrovittata Lian & Zheng, 1989
 Caryanda obtusidentata Fu & Zheng, 2004
 Caryanda olivacea Willemse, 1955
 Caryanda omeiensis Chang, 1939
 Caryanda palawana (Ramme, 1941)
 Caryanda paravicina (Willemse, 1925)
 Caryanda pelioncerca Zheng & Jiang, 2002
 Caryanda phippsi Roy & Mestre, 2020
 Caryanda pieli Chang, 1939
 Caryanda platycerca Willemse, 1924
 Caryanda platyvertica Yin, 1980
 Caryanda prominemargina Xie & Zheng, 1993
 Caryanda pulchra Brancsik, 1897
 Caryanda pumila Willemse, 1924
 Caryanda quadrata Bi & Xia, 1984
 Caryanda quadridenta Feng, Fu & Zheng, 2005
 Caryanda rufofemorata Ma & Zheng, 1992
 Caryanda sanguineoannulata Brunner von Wattenwyl, 1893
 Caryanda spuria (Stål, 1861) - type species (as Acridium spurium Stål)
 Caryanda tamdaoensis Storozhenko, 1992
 Caryanda tridentata Fu, Peng & Zhu, 1994
 Caryanda triodonta Fu & Zheng, 1994
 Caryanda triodontoides Meng & Xi, 2008
 Caryanda virida Ma, Guo & Zheng, 2000
 Caryanda vittata Li & Jin, 1984
 Caryanda wulingshana Fu & Zheng, 1994
 Caryanda xinpingensis Mao, 2017
 Caryanda xuefengshanensis Fu & Zheng, 2002
 Caryanda yangmingshana Fu & Zheng, 2003
 Caryanda yuanbaoshanensis Li, Lu & Jiang, 1995
 Caryanda yunnana Zheng, 1981
 Caryanda zhejiangensis Wang & Zheng, 2000
 Caryanda zheminzhengi Storozhenko, 2021

References 

 Mao, B-Y., Niu, Y., Zheng, Z-M. & Scott, M.B. 2015: Review of the genus Qinshuiacris (Orthoptera: Acrididae) from China with proposal of Caryanda viridis- species group and description of a new species. Zootaxa 3981 (4), pages 565–576, 

 
Acrididae genera
Taxa named by Carl Stål
Orthoptera of Asia